Below are statistics and records related to Hereford United Football Club.

Competition history
 Football League Second Division (second tier) – finished 22nd in only season (1976–77)
 Football League Third Division (third tier) – Champions (1975–76)
 Football League Fourth Division (fourth tier) – Runners-up (1972–73); Third Place (2007–08)
 Conference National – Runners-up (2003–04, 2004–05, 2005–06); Playoff Winners (2005–06)
 Southern Football League – Runners-up (1945–46, 1950–51, 1971–72); Regional Champions (1958–59)
 FA Cup – reached Fourth Round (1971–72, 1973–74, 1976–77, 1981–82, 1989–90, 1991–92, 2007–08, 2010–11)
 Football League Cup – reached Third Round (1973–74)
 Football League Trophy – reached Area Final (1985–86)
 Welsh Cup – Winners (1989–90); Runners-up (1967–68, 1975–76, 1980–81)
 FA Trophy – reached semi-final (1970–71, 2000–01)
 Southern League Cup – Winners (1951–52, 1956–57, 1958–59)

Overall Football League/Conference Record to 2013:
Division 2: 1976-7 (1 season)
Division 3/League 1: 1973–6, 1977–8, 2008-9 (5 seasons)
Division 4/League 2: 1972–3, 1978–97, 2006–8, 2009-12 (25 seasons)
Conference/Conference National: 1997–2006, 2012-3 (10 completed seasons)

Prior to 1972 the club played in various minor leagues.  See List of Hereford United F.C. seasons.

FA Cup

Record
Since 1924 Hereford United have reached the Fourth Round on seven occasions, losing each time.

 Longest FA Cup Run – 10 matches (Fourth Qualifying Round – Fourth Round Proper, 1971–72)

Giantkilling
Hereford United beat the following Football League teams whilst a non-league club.

 Exeter City (1952–53)
 Aldershot (1956–57)
 Queens Park Rangers (1957–58)
 Millwall (1965–66)
 Northampton Town (1970–71)
 Northampton Town (1971–72)
 Newcastle United (1971–72)
 Brighton & Hove Albion (1997–98)
 Colchester United (1997–98)
 York City (1999-00)
 Hartlepool United (1999-00)
 Wrexham (2001–02)
 Shrewsbury Town (2012–2013)

Records

National
 Competed in Highest Attended Match Between Non-League Clubs – 24,526 v Wigan Athletic (1953–54 FA Cup Second Round at The Hawthorns)
 Biggest Win by a Non-League Club over a League Club – 6–1 v Queens Park Rangers (1957–58 FA Cup Second Round)This record is shared with Wigan Athletic and Boston United

Club
 Record Competitive win – 11–0 v Thynnes Athletic (1947–48 FA Cup Preliminary Round)
 Record Competitive defeat* – 7–0 v Middlesbrough (1996–97 League Cup) - 7-0 v Luton "(2013-14 Conference)"
 Record Football League win – 6–0 v Burnley (1986–87 Fourth Division)
 Record Football League defeat – 7–1 v Mansfield Town (1994–95 Division Three)
 Record Conference win – 9–0 v Dagenham & Redbridge (2003–04)
 Record Conference defeat – 4–0 v Doncaster Rovers (2001–02)
 Record League Cup win – 4–0 v Bristol Rovers (1978–79), 5–1 v Bristol City (1985–86)
 Record Welsh Cup win – 10–1 v BSC Shotton (1985–86)
 Record Football League Trophy win – 4–0 v Yeovil Town (2000–01)
 Record Football League Trophy defeat – 4–0 v Millwall (1996–97)
 Record FA Trophy win – 7–1 v Bognor Regis Town (2005–06)
 Record Competitive home attendance – 18,114 v Sheffield Wednesday (1957–58 FA Cup Third Round)
 Record Football League attendance – 14,849 v Newport County (1972–73 Fourth Division)
 Record Conference attendance – 7,240 v Chester City (2003–04)
 Record league wins in a season – 34 (1964–65 Southern North West Division)
 Record league defeats in a season – 27 (1982–83 Fourth Division)
 Record league goals scored in a season – 124 (1964–65 Southern North West Division)
 Record league goals conceded in a season – 90 (1955–56 Southern Premier)
 Record total points in a season (2 pts for a win) – 72 (1964–65 Southern North West Division)
 Record total points in a season (3 pts for a win) – 91 (2003–04 Conference National)

Player
 Most Competitive appearances – John Layton Snr (549)
 Most Football League appearances – Mel Pejic (412)
 Most Conference appearances – Tony James (273)
 Most FA Cup appearances* – Chris Price, Mel Pejic and Tony James (19)
 Most League Cup appearances – Mel Pejic (25)
 Most Football League Trophy Appearances – Mel Pejic (27)
 Most FA Trophy Appearances – Tony James (21)
 Most Competitive goals – Charlie Thompson (184)
 Most Football League goals – Stewart Phillips (95)
 Most Conference goals – Steve Guinan (38)
 Most goals in a season (all competitions)* – Dixie McNeil (38 in 1975–76)
 Most Football League goals in a season – Dixie McNeil (35 in 1975–76)
 Most Conference goals in a season – Steve Guinan (25 in 2003–04)
 Most Competitive hat-tricks* – Dixie McNeil (5)
 Most goals in one match – Charlie Thompson (8 goals against Thynnes Athletic)
 Most consecutive appearances – Kevin Rose (253)
 Most international caps while a Hereford player – Brian Evans (1 cap for Wales)

General
 Highest transfer fee paid – £80,000 for Dean Smith (from Walsall in 1994)
 Highest transfer fee received – £440,000 for Darren Peacock (to Queens Park Rangers in 1990, including 10% sell on fee)
 Fastest goal – 12 seconds by Will Evans (v Macclesfield Town 2011–12)
 Fastest goal at Edgar Street – 14 seconds by Peter Heritage (v Lincoln City 1991–92)
 Oldest player – John Jackson (40 years, 6 days)
 Youngest player – Stewart Phillips (16 years, 112 days)
 Youngest Hat-Trick Scorer – Paul Burton (16 years, 264 days)

Managerial history
In its early years the club did not have a manager as such, the team was selected by the board committee and club secretary. The following individuals held a similar position during the early years of the club. (Year appointed in brackets)

 A.E. Jones (1924)
 Alf Basnett (1930)
 Lachlan McPherson (1935)
 Eric Keen (1939)
 Tom Price (1945)
 Fred Turner (1947)

All Time Goalscorers

Records And Statistics
Hereford United
Herefordshire F.C.